Le Rouget-Pers is a commune in the Cantal department of southern France. The municipality was established on 1 January 2016 and consists of the former communes of Le Rouget and Pers.

See also 
Communes of the Cantal department

References 

Communes of Cantal
Populated places established in 2016